German military law has a long history.

Early history 
Drumhead courts-martial in the German lands had existed since the Early modern period. 

The trial of Peter von Hagenbach by an ad hoc tribunal of the Holy Roman Empire in 1474 was the first "international" recognition of commanders' obligations to act lawfully. Hagenbach was put on trial for atrocities committed during the Burgundian Wars against the civilians of Breisach. Standing accused of allowing his troops to commit mass murder and war rape, which, "he as a knight was deemed to have a duty to prevent", and of personally committing perjury, Hagenbach replied that he could not be held criminally responsible because he only followed orders from the Duke of Burgundy, Charles the Bold, against whose rule the city of Breisach had rebelled. The court, however, rejected the superior orders defence. Peter von Hagenbach was found guilty of war crimes and executed by beheading at Breisgach on 4 May 1474. Despite the fact there was no explicit use of the term command responsibility, the trial of Peter von Hagenbach is seen as the first war crimes prosecution based on this principle.

During the Thirty Years' War several Imperial states established military tribunals modelled on the jurisdiction of the Swedish Army. In Brandenburg-Prussia, justice was dispensed by special Auditeur attorneys through three official channels.

German Empire
After the Prussian-led Unification of Germany, the German Empire with effect from 1 October 1900 established a particular court-martial jurisdiction to try soldiers of the German Army, with the Reichsmilitärgericht (RMG) in Charlottenburg as the supreme court. In Prussia it replaced the Generalauditoriat agency, while the Kingdom of Bavaria retained the right to pass judgements to members of the Bavarian Army by a separate (the 3rd) senate. The presiding judge in the rank of a general or admiral was appointed directly by the German Emperor.

During World War I, Imperial German military courts routinely tried both soldiers and civilians who were alleged to have violated German military law. Especially well-known is the case of Edith Cavell, a British Intelligence operative under International Red Cross cover, who was court-martialled and sentenced to death in Occupied Belgium for, among many other things, helping an estimated 200 escaped British POW's to cross the lines and return to active service - which in wartime was indeed a death penalty offence under the German military law of the German Empire. Cavell was also convicted of perfidy, for having used the international legal protection given by her position as a Red Cross nurse as a cover for belligerent activity during wartime. Cavell was executed by firing squad on October 12, 1915.

Nazi Germany 

After World War I, the Weimar Republic (1919-1933), abolished separate courts-martial by Article 106 of the Weimar Constitution, but they were revived by the Nazi German government after it had seized power during the Machtergreifung and enacted a special law on 12 May 1933. Initially the Reichsgericht in Leipzig, from 1 December 1934 the "People's Court" (Volksgerichtshof) in Berlin, acted as final appellate court until the Reichskriegsgericht (RKG) was established as high court of the Wehrmacht armed forces by another directive with effect from 1 October 1936. The Reichskriegsgericht was based in the former RMG building on Witzlebenstraße in the Charlottenburg district of Berlin.

A directive on a special criminal law of war was already enacted on 17 August 1938 by OKW chief Wilhelm Keitel at the behest of Führer Adolf Hitler. From the beginning of World War II, the court convicted not only Wehrmacht members but also prisoners-of-war and civilians in the area of operations. The Reichskriegsgericht acted as the first and last resort for 44 criminal offenses under penalty of death such as the following:
 High treason (Hochverrat),
 State treason (Landesverrat), primarily espionage
 War treason (Kriegsverrat), a diffuse term applied to all kind of actions that weaken the military strength of Germany and her allies, like perfidy, espionage, "conveying soldiers to the enemy", etc.
 Subversion of military strength (Wehrkraftzersetzung), which encompassed even critical statements
 Conscientious objection (Kriegsdienstverweigerung) and desertion (Fahnenflucht).

With the arms buildup and continued warfare, the number of Wehrmacht courts-martial increased to over 1,000. On 13 May 1941 Hitler had Keitel pass a directive, according to which any Wehrmacht officer had the authority to execute accused civilians in the area of Operation Barbarossa and the Eastern Front without trial. Against the laws of war, the official repeal of criminal prosecution led to widespread hostage-taking, mass executions, burning and looting by German forces.
 
On March 8, 1945, Chancellor Adolf Hitler authorized the use of Fliegendes Sonder-Standgericht (Flying Courts-Martial) to try German armed forces in the field. The use of "flying" refers to their mobility and may also refer to the earlier "flying courts martial" held in Italian Libya. Italian military judges were flown by aircraft to the location of captured rebels where the rebels were tried in a court martial shortly after capture.

Between 1939 and 1945 the Reichskriegsgericht in Berlin was responsible for over 1,400 executions including those by the Red Orchestra. In 1943 the court was transferred to Torgau, where it was based until the end of the war. In 1951 the building became the temporarily base of the Berlin Kammergericht (appellate court), since 2005 it is a private estate.

After the German Instrument of Surrender, Nazi courts martial were not abolished by the Allied Control Council until 20 August 1946. In 2002 and 2009 the German Bundestag parliament has finally passed bills to suspend the verdicts against Wehrmacht for desertion and homosexual activity as well as against "war traitors".

Current law 
Since 1949, the Federal Republic of Germany has no special military courts. Criminal acts committed by soldiers are tried in ordinary criminal courts by civilian judges.

Article 96 paragraph 2 of German Basic Law (Grundgesetz) allows the government to create specialised military courts in case of war and for soldiers sent abroad, subject to a federal law. Such a law has not been passed.

Smaller offences are being handled by disciplinary courts which are attached to the administrative court system. They may only pronounce disciplinary punishments, but no criminal sentences (e.g. no imprisonment, except 21 days of detention in the watch room).

Commemorative plaques

See also 
 War crimes of the Wehrmacht
 Military law
 Court martial
 Command and obedience in the Bundeswehr
 Franz Jägerstätter
 Karl Sack

References

External links 
  Luise Berlin - Reichskriegsgericht (Gedenktafel, Geschichte, Literatur)
  Berlin-Lexikon: Reichskriegsgericht

 

de:Reichskriegsgericht